Gilles Lellouche (born 5 July 1972) is a French actor. He started his career as a director. Lellouche has appeared in more than fifty films since 1995. He was nominated twice for a César Award; in 2006 for Most Promising Actor and in 2011 for Best Supporting actor for his performance in Little White Lies.

From 2002 to 2013, Lellouche was in a relationship with actress Mélanie Doutey. They have a daughter named Ava, born on 5 September 2009. His brother Philippe Lellouche is also an actor and director.

Early life
Lellouche was born in Savigny-sur-Orge, France, to a father of Algerian-Jewish descent, and to a mother of Irish Catholic background.

Filmography

As actor

As director

References

External links 

 

1972 births
Living people
French people of Algerian-Jewish descent
French people of Irish descent
Jewish French male actors
French male film actors
French film directors
People from Savigny-sur-Orge
21st-century French male actors
French male screenwriters
20th-century French male actors
Cours Florent alumni